Emilio may refer to:

 Emilio Navaira, a Mexican-American singer often called "Emilio"
 Emilio Piazza Memorial School, in Port Harcourt, Rivers State
 Emilio (given name)
 Emilio (film), a 2008 film by Kim Jorgensen

See also
 Emílio (disambiguation)
 Emilios (disambiguation)